Švábovce is a village and municipality in Poprad District in the Prešov Region of northern Slovakia.

History
In historical records the village was first mentioned in 1268.

Geography
The municipality lies at an altitude of 639 metres and covers an area of 9.174 km². It has a population of about 1478 people.

Economy and infrastructure
Švábovce is partially a bedroom community for the Poprad. It is a modern village with ongoing construction of new dwellings. Cultural sightseeings are classical evangelical and gothic catholic churches.

References

External links
http://svabovce.e-obce.sk
http://www.svabovce.ocu.sk/

Villages and municipalities in Poprad District